The 25th Flying Training Squadron is part of the 71st Flying Training Wing based at Vance Air Force Base, Oklahoma. It operates Northrop T-38 Talon aircraft conducting flight training.

Overview
The squadron has provided Undergraduate Pilot Training (UPT) for active duty, Air National Guard, Air Force Reserve, and selected foreign allies since 1 November 1972.

History
The 25th flew combat reconnaissance missions in the Southwest and Western Pacific from, 5 February 1944 – 14 August 1945. It was active but not operationally manned or equipped from, November 1945 – February 1946. The squadron also conducted photographic reconnaissance in western United States between 1955 and 1957.

Lineage
 Constituted as the 25th Photographic Reconnaissance Squadron on 5 February 1943
 Redesignated 25th Photographic Squadron (Light) on 6 February 1943
 Activated on 9 February 1943
 Redesignated 25th Photographic Reconnaissance Squadron on 11 August 1943
 Redesignated 25th Tactical Reconnaissance Squadron on 24 January 1946
 Inactivated on 1 April 1949
 Redesignated 25th Strategic Reconnaissance Squadron, Fighter on 4 November 1954
 Activated on 24 January 1955
 Inactivated on 1 July 1957
 Redesignated 25th Flying Training Squadron on 14 April 1972
 Activated on 1 November 1972

Assignments
 6th Photographic Group (later 6th Photographic Reconnaissance and Mapping Group, 6th Photographic Reconnaissance Group 6th Photographic Group 6th Reconnaissance Group) Group]], 9 February 1943 (attached to V Fighter Command after 10 February 1946)
 V Fighter Command, 27 April 1946
 315th Composite Wing, 31 May 1946
 71st Reconnaissance Group (later 71st Tactical Reconnaissance Group), 28 February 1947 – 1 April 1949 (attached to 315th Composite Wing until November 1947)
 71st Strategic Reconnaissance Wing, 24 January 1955 – 1 July 1957
 71st Flying Training Wing, 1 November 1972
 71st Operations Group, 15 December 1991 – present

Stations

 Colorado Springs Army Air Base, Colorado, 9 February – 22 October 1943
 Sydney Airport, Australia, 19 November 1943
 Archerfield Airport, Brisbane, Australia, 25 November 1943 – 19 January 1944
 Lae Airfield, New Guinea, 3 February 1944
 Nadzab Airfield Complex, New Guinea, 7 February 1944
 Mokmer Airfield, Biak, Netherlands East Indies, 23 July – 16 November 1944
 Dulag Airfield, Leyte, Philippines, 24 November 1944
 San Jose Airfield, Mindoro, Philippines, 3 January 1944
 Detachment at Dulag Airfield, Leyte, Philippines, to 6 February 1945
 Air echelon at Clark Field, Luzon, Philippines, 14 June – 14 July 1945

 Motobu Airfield, Okinawa, 9 July 1945
 Chofu Airfield, Japan, 27 September 1945
 Itazuke Air Base, Japan, 10 February 1946
 Itami Airfield, Japan, 30 March 1946 – 1 April 1949
 Larson Air Force Base, Washington, 24 January 1955 – 1 July 1957
 Vance Air Force Base, Oklahoma, 1 November 1972 – present

Aircraft
 Lockheed F-5 Lightning (1943–1945)
 North American B-25 Mitchell (1944)
 North American F-6 Mustang (1946–1949)
 Stinson L-5 Sentinel (1946)
 Beechcraft F-2 Expeditor (1947–1948)
 Republic RF-84F Thunderflash (1955–1957)
 Northrop T-38 Talon (1972–present)

References

Notes
 Explanatory notes

 Citations

Bibliography

External links

025
0025